Johann Wilhelm Wilms (March 30, 1772 (baptized) – July 19, 1847) was a Dutch-German composer, best known for setting the poem Wien Neêrlands Bloed to music, which served as the Dutch national anthem from 1815 to 1932.

Biography
Wilms was born in Witzhelden, a small town near Solingen. After receiving lessons from his father and oldest brother in piano and composition, Wilms studied flute on his own. He moved to Amsterdam in 1791 where he played the flute in two orchestras and was soloist in Mozart and Beethoven piano concertos, giving them their Dutch premieres.

He also taught piano at the Koninklijk Nederlandsch Instituut voor Wetenschappen, interviewed applicants for church organist positions, judged composition competitions and wrote for the Allgemeine musikalische Zeitung, a publication he once used as a soapbox to complain about the lack of performance of music by contemporary Dutch composers like himself.

As the events of the French Revolution affected the Netherlands, Wilms wrote several patriotic hymns. However, following the fall of Napoleon and the return of the House of Orange to power, Wilms in 1816 won the open competition for the new Dutch anthem with Wien Neêrlands Bloed (with lyrics by Hendrik Tollens). This led to an increase in commissions by churches and other organisations.

For 23 years Wilms was the organist at a Mennonite church in Amsterdam, where he died.

In 2003, the International Johann Wilhelm Wilms Society (German: Johann Wilhelm Wilms Gesellschaft) was established in Bonn.

Symphonies
Wilms wrote seven symphonies. His symphony in F major was lost and the others sank into obscurity after his death. The chronology of the five early symphonies is not clear even to experts.

His Symphony No. 6 in D minor, which won first prize at the Société des Beaux-Arts Ghent, and Symphony No. 7 in C minor, were recorded in 2003 by Concerto Köln for Deutsche Grammophon.

Selected list of works
 Concert Overture in E major 
 Flute Concertino in G minor
 Sonata in D major for Piano Four-Hands, Opus 7 (1800)
 Piano Concerto No. 1 in E major, Opus 3 (1799)
 Symphony No. 1 in C major, Opus 9 (c. 1806)
 Symphony No. 2 in F major, Opus 10 (c. 1808, lost)
 Piano Concerto No. 2 in C major, Opus 12 (c. 1807)
 Piano Sonata in B-flat major, Opus 13 (1808)
 Symphony No. 3 in E-flat major, Opus 14 (c. 1808)
 Three Violin Sonatas, Opus 21
 Piano Quartet in C major, Opus 22 (1822)
 Symphony No. 4 in C minor, Opus 23 (c. 1812)
 Flute Concerto in D major, Opus 24
 Two String Quartets (in G minor (c. 1806) and A major), Opus 25. Published in 2007. 
 Sonata in C major for Piano Four-Hands, Opus 31 (1813)
 Flute Sonata in D, Opus 33 (1813)
 Sonata in B-flat for Piano Four-Hands, Opus 41 (ca. 1813)
 Symphony No. 5 in D major, Opus 52 (c. 1817)
 Symphony No. 6 in D minor, Opus 58 (c. 1823)
 Symphony No. 7 in C minor (c. 1836)
 Wien Neêrlandsch bloed
 Overture in D major
 Overture in E-flat major (edited by B. Hagels and published in 2006)

Johann Wilhelm Wilms completed at least 5 piano concertos and 5 overtures.

Bibliography
 Jan ten Bokum: "Wilms, Johann Wilhelm", in The New Grove Dictionary of Music and Musicians, ed. S. Sadie and J. Tyrrell (London: Macmillan, 2001), .
 Barry S. Brook & Barbara B. Heyman (editors): The Symphony: 1720–1840, series C, volume 13 (New York: Garland Publishing, 1986), .

References

External links
 Symphonies with Concerto Köln on Deutsche Grammophon
 Local Wilms website from his place of birth - the village Witzhelden 
 

1772 births
1847 deaths
18th-century classical composers
18th-century German composers
18th-century German male musicians
19th-century classical composers
19th-century German composers
19th-century German male musicians
Dutch classical composers
Dutch male classical composers
Dutch people of German descent
Dutch Romantic composers
German emigrants to the Netherlands
German male classical composers
German Romantic composers
People from Rheinisch-Bergischer Kreis
String quartet composers